Ponnambalam Kumaraswamy (often referred to as Poondi Kumaraswamy) (October 4, 1930 - March 9, 1988)  
was an Indian hydrologist. He was elected a Fellow of the Indian Academy of Sciences in 1972 although his only formal education was a Civil Engineering Bachelor's degree from College of Engineering, Guindy, University of Madras. Before his death in 1988, at 57 years old, he was the only one to have received both the Homi Bhabha Fellowship 1967-69  (he spent his time at the Tata Institute of Fundamental Research, Bombay, and at the Massachusetts Institute of Technology, Cambridge, Massachusetts doing research in Groundwater modeling) and the Jawaharlal Nehru Fellowship 1975-77, two of the country's top research awards.

During the period of Jawaharlal Nehru Fellowship he created the first comprehensive 20 volume hydrological atlas of Tamil Nadu State of India including mathematical models, details of hydraulic structures, among others. He developed also the double bounded probability density function (Kumaraswamy distribution), a probability density function suitable for physical variables that are usually bounded. This distribution  is in use in electrical, civil,  mechanical, and financial engineering applications. He gave the first practical hard rock well theory that won him the Gold Medal award from Indian Geohydrologists in 1974. He worked also as a design and construction  engineer of two major industrial works, namely, the Tiruchirappalli Boiler Plant, and the Tuticorin Harbour Project. In addition he was involved in the hydraulic design of numerous dams, canals, and other hydraulic structures throughout South India.
Kumaraswamy considered explaining the work of the Institute of Hydraulics and Hydrology (IHH), Poondi to engineers and non-engineers an important duty and often had great success with it.

He was also well known among many as a rationalist and a humanist influenced much by Periyar Ramasami and was in continuous association with Periyar's rationalist organization even during the periods of emergency (1975) when many of Periyar's followers suffered, some even became afraid to associate with Periyar or his movements due to the atrocities inflicted on them at that time. He was a close friend of K. Veeramani.

References

1930 births
1988 deaths
20th-century Indian engineers
Tamil scientists
20th-century Indian mathematicians
Indian hydrologists
Jawaharlal Nehru Fellows
Indian Tamil people
Engineers from Tamil Nadu
Indian irrigation engineers
20th-century Indian earth scientists